The Women's mass start competition at the 2017 World Championships was held on 19 February 2017.

Results
The race was started at 11:30.

References

Women's mass start
2017 in Austrian women's sport
Biath